Rajiv J. "Raj" Shah (born March 9, 1973) is the President of the Rockefeller Foundation. He is a former American government official, physician and health economist who served as the 16th Administrator of the United States Agency for International Development (USAID) from 2010–2015.

Background, education and early career 
Shah was born to Indian Gujarati immigrant parents who settled in Ann Arbor, Michigan in the late 1960s. Shah is an adherent of the Hindu faith. He grew up in the Detroit area and attended Wylie E. Groves High School. He graduated from the University of Michigan with a Bachelor of Science in Economics. He went on to earn a Master of Science in Health Economics from the University of Pennsylvania, Wharton School of Business and a Doctor of Medicine from the University of Pennsylvania, Perelman School of Medicine. Shah also spent time at the London School of Economics where he earned a general course certificate in economics. During the 2000 Gore-Lieberman Presidential Campaign, Shah was a health policy advisor and research associate. He also served as a member of Governor Ed Rendell's (D-PA) transition committee on health.

The Gates Foundation 
Shah joined the Bill & Melinda Gates Foundation in 2001, serving in a range of leadership roles including Director of Agricultural Development, Director of Strategic Opportunities, Deputy Director of Policy and Finance and Chief Economist. 

Shah was also responsible for developing the International Finance Facility for Immunization, which raised more than $5 billion for the Global Alliance for Vaccines and Immunization (GAVI). IFFI has been recognized as an example of the power of innovative financing for global development.

Obama administration

United States Department of Agriculture (USDA) 
Shah was nominated by President Obama to serve as Chief Scientist and Undersecretary of Agriculture for Research, Education and Economics on April 17, 2009. He was confirmed unanimously by the United States Senate on May 12, 2009.

United States Agency for International Development (USAID) 
Shah was nominated to serve as the 16th Administrator of USAID on November 10, 2009 and confirmed by the United States Senate unanimously on Christmas Eve, December 24, 2009. He was sworn into office by Secretary of State Hillary Rodham Clinton on January 7, 2010.

Emergency management  
On his fifth day as Administrator, a 7.0 magnitude earthquake struck Port-au-Prince, Haiti, that destroyed the capital and killed more than 200,000 citizens. Shah was tasked by President Obama to lead the United States response to the disaster, launching one of the largest humanitarian efforts in history.

Reforming USAID 
Shah worked to reform how USAID conducted business. He promoted a new model of development based on engagement with the private sector. He earned bipartisan support for his efforts, which included increasing his Agency's budget growth during a time of sequestration.

Food security reform 
Shah led efforts to reform food security in an effort to fight against hunger around the world. Shah used the Camp David G8 Summit in 2012 to attract private investment commitments to the effort.

Maternal and child health 
As Administrator of USAID, Shah restructured $2.9 billion of global health investments to focus on cost-effective ways to save lives of children under the age of five in priority countries. He created a partnership co-led by Ethiopia, India and UNICEF, "A Promise Renewed", to have more than one hundred partner countries restructure health priorities and invest in measurement to deliver better outcomes. As a result of these and other efforts, the global level of child deaths is coming down faster than previously expected.

U.S. Global Development Lab 
Shah continued building on his new model of development in 2014 when he announced the establishment of the United States Global Development Lab.

Power Africa 
In 2013, President Obama launched Power Africa, bringing together technical and legal experts, the private sector, and governments from around the world to work in partnership to increase the number of people with access to power. As Administrator, Shah led the Administration's efforts to secure billions of dollars of private investments for African power development to bring more than 26,000 MW of power online.

Later career  
After Shah resigned from USAID on January 30, 2015, he was appointed Distinguished Fellow in Residence at Georgetown University, Edmund A. Walsh School of Foreign Service, developing and teaching a graduate seminar on Rethinking Global Development and National Security policy with an emphasis on fragile states, data and innovation. He also founded and serves as Managing Partner for Latitude Capital, a global emerging markets power and infrastructure private equity firm.

United Nations High-Level Panel on the Global Response to Health Crises 
In 2015, Shah was one of six global leaders appointed by United Nations Secretary General Ban Ki-moon to review the world's capacity to prepare for and respond to global pandemic threats. The panel presented their findings and recommendations to the Secretary General, UN General Assembly, and the G8 and G20 groups of leaders.

Moneyball for Government 
Shah co-authored a bipartisan chapter in the second edition of the book, Moneyball for Government, with Michael Gerson, former Assistant to the President for Policy & Strategic Planning under President George W. Bush. The chapter, titled "Foreign Assistance and the Revolution of Rigor", calls for data and evidence to drive U.S. foreign aid and provides a roadmap for improving and sustaining foreign assistance programs.

The Rockefeller Foundation 
On January 5, 2017, the Board of Trustees announced the unanimous selection of Shah to serve as the thirteenth president of the Rockefeller Foundation. He assumed office on March 1, 2017, succeeding Dr. Judith Rodin, who had served as president for nearly twelve years. Shah is the first-ever Indian-American to serve as president of the foundation. The mission of the Foundation is to improve the lives of humanity around the world.

Awards and recognition 
Shah has been the recipient of numerous awards including the Secretary of State's Distinguished Service Award (2013); the Pravasi Bharatiya Samman Award, the highest official honor for non-resident Indian, awarded by the President of India (2011); the U.S. Global Leadership Council Tribute Award (2014); and the Gene White Lifetime Achievement Award for Child Nutrition (2014);.

Shah has been awarded numerous honorary degrees including American University, Doctor of International Affairs (2012), Tuskegee University, Doctor of Science (2012), and Colby College, Doctor of Laws (2011).

 2020 Thomas Jefferson Foundation Medalist in Citizen Leadership

Board and affiliations 
Shah currently sits on numerous boards including Trustee of the Rockefeller Foundation, International Rescue Committee, Chicago Council on Global Affairs, Results for America, Trilateral Commission, the Atlantic Council and The National Geographic Society. He is also a member on the Council of Foreign Relations On January 4, 2017 he was elected President of the Rockefeller Foundation, the first Indian-American to hold that post.

Personal life 
Shah is married to Shivam Mallick Shah. They have three children and currently reside in Washington, D.C.

References

External links

Commissioners at Lancet Commission on COVID-19
USAID Bio

 
Atlantic Council 
1973 births
American politicians of Indian descent
Living people
Obama administration personnel
Politicians from Ann Arbor, Michigan
United States Department of Agriculture officials
University of Michigan alumni
Perelman School of Medicine at the University of Pennsylvania alumni
Wharton School of the University of Pennsylvania alumni
American diplomats
Administrators of the United States Agency for International Development
Presidents of the Rockefeller Foundation
Gujarati people
American people of Gujarati descent